Banská Bystrica mesto railway station serves the city of Banská Bystrica in central Slovakia.

History
The station was opened on 3 September 1873 as  together with the rest of the Zvolen–Banská Bystrica section of the Vrútky–Zvolen railway.

Services

See also

History of rail transport in Slovakia
Rail transport in Slovakia

References

Buildings and structures in Banská Bystrica
Railway stations in Banská Bystrica
Railway stations in Banská Bystrica Region
Railway stations opened in 1873
Railway stations in Slovakia opened in the 19th century